Aşağı Çaykənd (before 1991 Barum)  is a village and municipality in the Shamkir Rayon of Azerbaijan. It has a population of 373.

References

Populated places in Shamkir District